Anthony John Shaw Smith (born 8 February 1951) is a South African former cricketer.

Smith was born at Johannesburg in February 1951. He made his debut in first-class cricket for the South African Universities cricket team against Western Province at Newlands in December 1971. He made his debut for Natal in first-class cricket in the 1972–73 Currie Cup against Rhodesia. Smith played first-class cricket for Natal until December 1983, making 96 appearances. Playing as a wicket-keeper, he scored 3,559 runs in these matches at an average of 26.75 and a high score of 150 not out. He made two first-class centuries and fifteen half centuries. Behind the stumps he took 293 catches and made 11 stumpings. Smith also played first-class cricket on four occasions for the South African Board President's XI and once each for a South African Invitation XI and D. H. Robins' XI, the latter in England at Eastbourne against the touring Pakistanis. Smith also played List A one-day cricket for Natal on 43 occasions between the 1972/73 and 1984/84 seasons, scoring 584 runs at an average of 18.83. Smith passed fifty once in one-day cricket, scoring 121 against Border in November 1980. In addition to playing one-day cricket for Natal, he also played twice for a South African Invitation XI.

His brother-in-law, Richard Lumb, and cousin, Patrick Dewes, both played first-class cricket. His nephew, Michael Lumb, played international cricket for England.

References

External links

1951 births
Living people
People from Johannesburg
South African cricketers
South African Universities cricketers
KwaZulu-Natal cricketers
D. H. Robins' XI cricketers